Year 802 (DCCCII) was a common year starting on Saturday (link will display the full calendar) of the Julian calendar.

Events 
 By place 

 Byzantine Empire 
 October 31 – Empress Irene is deposed after a 5-year reign, and banished to Lesbos. High-ranking patricians place Nikephoros, the minister of finance (logothetes tou genikou), on the throne. He is crowned in the Hagia Sophia at Constantinople, by Patriarch Tarasios, as emperor of the Byzantine Empire.

Central America
May 1 – Lachan Kʼawiil Ajaw Bot (born June 25, 760) becomes the ruler of the Mayan city state near Itzan in Guatemala.

 Europe 
 Pagan Danes invade Obodrite-ruled Schleswig, to take over territory almost emptied by the forcible deportations of the Saxons by emperor Charlemagne.
 Al-Andalus: Saragossa rises against the Emirate of Córdoba. Emir Al-Hakam I sends a Muslim army under General Amrus ibn Yusuf, and retakes the city.
 Krum becomes ruler (khan) of the Bulgarian Empire (until 814). During his reign Bulgarian territory doubles in size, from the Danube to the Dniester.

 Britain 
 King Beorhtric of Wessex dies after drinking a chalice of poison intended for his wife, Eadburh. She flees to the court of Charlemagne, who accepts a portion of her wealth and makes her abbess. Prince Egbert returns to Wessex, and is accepted as the new king.
 Battle of Kempsford: Æthelmund, ealdorman of Hwicce, is killed during the battle by his rival Weohstan, who levies West Saxon Wiltshire.
 The Vikings plunder the treasures of Iona Abbey, on the west coast of Scotland (approximate date).

 Abbasid Caliphate 
 The Mecca Protocol: Caliph Harun al-Rashid and the leading officials of the Abbasid Caliphate perform the hajj to Mecca, where the line of succession is finalized. Harun's eldest son al-Amin is named heir, but his second son al-Ma'mun is named as al-Amin's heir, and ruler of a broadly autonomous Khurasan. A third son, al-Qasim, is added as third heir, and receives responsibility over the frontier areas with the Byzantine Empire.

 Asia 
 Prince Jayavarman declares the Khmer Empire (modern-day Cambodia) independent, and establishes the kingdom of Angkor. He is reconsecrated as a world ruler (chakravartin), or god-king (devaraja), under Hindu rites.

 By topic 

 Religion 
 The Haeinsa Temple of the Jogye Order is built in Korea.

Births 
 Bi Xian, chancellor of the Tang Dynasty (d. 864)
 Fujiwara no Nagara, Japanese statesman (d. 856)
 Hugh, illegitimate son of Charlemagne (d. 844)
 Ono no Takamura, Japanese scholar and poet (d. 853)
 Ralpacan, emperor of Tibet (d. 836)

Deaths 
 January 11 – Paulinus II, patriarch of Aquileia (or 804)
 Æthelmund, Anglo-Saxon nobleman
 Bahlul ibn Marzuq, Muslim general
 Beorhtric, king of Wessex
 Domitian, duke of Carantania (approximate date)
 Eadburh, Anglo-Saxon princess
 Kardam, ruler (khan) of the Bulgarian Empire (or 803)
 Rashid, Muslim regent of Idris II
 Višeslav, duke of Croatia (or 810)
 Wulfstan, Anglo-Saxon ealdorman
 Theoctista, politically influential Byzatine woman (b. 740)

References

Sources